The 2007–08 Pittsburgh Panthers men's basketball team represented the University of Pittsburgh in the 2007–08 NCAA Division I men's basketball season. Led by head coach Jamie Dixon, the Panthers finished with a record of 27–10 and made it to the second round of the 2008 NCAA Division I men's basketball tournament where they lost to Michigan State.

References

Pittsburgh Panthers men's basketball seasons
Pittsburgh
Pittsburgh
Pittsburgh Pan
Pittsburgh Pan